Mats Olof Aronsson (born 16 Augusti 1951) is a Swedish former footballer who played as a forward for the Swedish clubs Landskrona BoIS and Djurgårdens IF. He became the top scorer in Allsvenskan 1977 together with Reine Almqvist. Between 2007 and the spring of 2014 he worked as the Director of Sports in the Swedish football club Landskrona BoIS. He is the current chairman of IK Frej Täby.

Honours

Club
Djurgårdens IF
 Division 2 Norra: 1982

Individual
 Allsvenskan top scorer: 1977

References

Living people
1951 births
Association football forwards
Swedish footballers
Djurgårdens IF Fotboll players
Landskrona BoIS players
Allsvenskan players
Landskrona BoIS directors and chairmen